Bryan Brandenburg (born February 18, 1959 in Châteauroux, France) is a biophysicist, author, technology entrepreneur and former game programmer. Brandenburg is best known as co-founder of Zenerchi, Sculptured Software and Salt Lake Comic Con and Executive Producer at Engineering Animation, Inc.

Career
After completing his studies in mathematics and physics in 1982, Brandenburg began programming 3D computer games on the Commodore 64 (C64), Apple II and later the IBM PC and Amiga.
Brandenburg started several technology companies that were later acquired by private and public corporations. In 1984, he co-founded Sculptured Software and led the company as President. The company was eventually sold for almost US$40 million after producing dozens of titles for the C64, Atari ST, Commodore Amiga, IBM PC and Apple II.

In 1994, Brandenburg started another game company, Software Arts International that was acquired in 1996 by Engineering Animation, Inc., where he was the Executive Producer for the public company's Interactive Division, producing titles for Disney, Mattel, Hasbro Interactive and Sierra On-Line.

In 1999, Bryan Brandenburg partnered with Karl Malone to build a media-centric outdoors media company (Amazing Outdoors) with websites, a television show, a radio program, a monthly magazine (Utah Outdoors), and a book publishing arm. The company was acquired in 2001.

Brandenburg was an executive officer of Daz 3D, a 3D content company and launched Bryce in July 2004. In January 2005, he was recruited as the CEO of Zygote Media Group and launched Male Anatomy Collection 2.0, the 3DScience.com website, Female Anatomy Collection 3.0 and Zygote Heart 3.0. In 2006, Brandenburg partnered with Content Paradise  produce a current 3D model of the solar system including planets, moons and asteroid field.

Brandenburg is the co-founder of Salt Lake Comic Con, later renamed FanX. As Chief Marketing Officer, he announced a global partnership with PopLife Entertainment, the company that distributes the big-headed Funko Pop! figures in Asia, to bring FanX events to China, Thailand and the Philippines. In November 2017, he was inducted in the Honorary Commander program for the 419th Fighter Wing at Hill Air Force Base. Brandenburg stepped aside in May 2018 in response to criticism of how he handled a sexual harassment complaint that took place between Dan Farr and Richard Paul Evans. He returned after a brief absence in the Fall of 2018.

In 2019 Bryan Brandenburg announced Zenerchi, a biomedical simulation and visualization AI company after raising $1.2 million in seed funding.    Brandenburg announced an international partnership with Pop Life Global in December 2019 to produce a series of exhibitions called The Human Xperience.  Brandenburg sold his shares in FanX in 2019. In 2022, Brandenburg was arrested in Hawaii on charges of sending emails to various people, threatening to bomb various buildings in Utah.

Major software contributions
Trophy Buck (Windows)
Outburst (Windows)
Bryce (Windows/Mac)
Clue (Windows)
Crime Wave (MS-DOS)
World Class Leader Board (Amiga)
Leader Board (Amiga)
Echelon (MS-DOS)
Ninja (MS-DOS)
Raid Over Moscow (Apple II)
Beach Head II (Apple II)
Sentinel (Commodore 64)
A Bug's Life (Microsoft Windows)
DAZ/Studio (Windows/Mac)

Published print media
Become a 3D Art Professional
Million Dollar Computer Consultant

References

External links
Bryan Brandenburg's Science Visualization Blog and Personal Gallery
Bryan Brandenburg on Moby Games
 

1959 births
Living people
Businesspeople from Utah
People from Châteauroux
American video game designers
American information and reference writers
American instructional writers
Alumni